The Forward, formerly known as The Jewish Daily Forward, is an American news media organization for a Jewish American audience. Founded in 1897 as a Yiddish-language daily socialist newspaper, The New York Times reported that Seth Lipsky "started an English-language offshoot of the Yiddish-language newspaper" as a weekly newspaper in 1990.

In the 21st century The Forward is a digital publication with online reporting. In 2016, the publication of the Yiddish version changed its print format from a biweekly newspaper to a monthly magazine; the English weekly paper followed suit in 2017. Those magazines were published until 2019.

The Forwards perspective on world and national news and its reporting on the Jewish perspective on modern United States have made it one of the most influential American Jewish publications. It is published by an independent nonprofit association. It has a politically progressive editorial focus.

The Yiddish Forward (Forverts) is a clearinghouse for the latest developments in the Yiddish world with almost daily news reports related to Yiddish language and culture as well as videos of cooking demonstrations, Yiddish humor and new songs. A Yiddish rendition of the Leonard Cohen song "Hallelujah", translated and performed by klezmer musician Daniel Kahn, garnered over a million views.

On January 17, 2019, the publication announced it would discontinue its print edition and only publish its English and Yiddish editions online. Layoffs of its editor-in-chief and 20% of its editorial staff were also announced.

Jodi Rudoren was named editor in July 2019, and took charge in September 2019.

History

Origins
The first issue of Forverts appeared on April 22, 1897, in New York City. The paper was founded by a group of about 50 Yiddish-speaking socialists who had organized three months earlier as the Forward Publishing Association. The paper's name, as well as its political orientation, was borrowed from the German Social Democratic Party and its organ Vorwärts.

Forverts was a successor to New York's first Yiddish-language socialist newspaper, Di Arbeter Tsaytung (The Workman's Paper), a weekly established in 1890 by the fledgling Jewish trade union movement centered in the United Hebrew Trades, as a vehicle for bringing socialist and trade unionist ideas to Yiddish-speaking immigrants, primarily from eastern Europe. This paper had been merged into a new Yiddish daily called Dos Abend Blatt (The Evening Paper) as its weekend supplement when that publication was launched in 1894 under the auspices of the Socialist Labor Party (SLP). As this publication established itself, it came under increased political pressure from the de facto head of the SLP, Daniel De Leon, who attempted to maintain a rigid ideological line with respect to its content. It was this centralizing political pressure which had been the motivating factor for a new publication.

Chief among the dissident socialists of the Forward Publishing Association were Louis Miller and Abraham Cahan. These two founding fathers of The Forward were quick to enlist in the ranks of a new rival socialist political party founded in 1897, the Social Democratic Party of America, founded by the nationally famous leader of the 1894 American Railway Union strike, Eugene V. Debs, and Victor L. Berger, a German-speaking teacher and newspaper publisher from Milwaukee. Both joined the SDP in July 1897.

Despite this political similarity, Miller and Cahan differed as to the political orientation of the paper and Cahan left after just four months to join the staff of The Commercial Advertiser, a well-established Republican newspaper also based in New York City.

First fifty years 
For the next four years, until 1901, Cahan remained outside of The Forward office, learning the newspaper trade in a financially successful setting. He only returned, he later recalled in his memoir, upon the promise of "absolute full power" over the editorial desk.

The circulation of the paper, which was described as "one of the first national newspapers," grew quickly, paralleling the rapid growth of the Yiddish speaking population of the United States. By 1912 its circulation was 120,000, and by the late 1920s/early 1930s, The Forward was a leading U.S. metropolitan daily with considerable influence and a nationwide circulation of more than 275,000 though this had dropped to 170,000 by 1939 as a result of changes in U.S. immigration policy that restricted the immigration of Jews to a trickle.

Early on, The Forward defended trade unionism and moderate, democratic socialism. The paper was a significant participant in the activities of the International Ladies' Garment Workers' Union; Benjamin Schlesinger, a former president of the ILGWU, became the general manager of the paper in 1923, then returned to the presidency of the union in 1928. The paper was also an early supporter of David Dubinsky, Schlesinger's eventual successor.

In 1933–34, The Forward was the first to publish Fred Beal's eyewitness reports of bureaucratic privilege and of famine in the Soviet Union, accounts of the kind that much of the liberal and left-wing press disparaged and resisted. His story corroborated that of the paper's labor editor, Harry Lang, who had visited Soviet Ukraine.

In response to the first reports of atrocities against the Jewish population of German-occupied Poland, special correspondent A. Brodie complained of exaggerated dispatches and lack of facts. But as accounts accumulated in the winter of 1939-40 of mass arrests, forced labor, massacres, executions and expulsions, the paper discerned the outline of the unfolding Holocaust.

The best-known writer in the Yiddish Forward was Isaac Bashevis Singer, who received the Nobel Prize in Literature. Other well known contributors included Leon Trotsky and Morris Winchevsky.

After World War II
By 1962, circulation was down to 56,126 daily and 59,636 Sunday, and by 1983 the newspaper was published only once a week, with an English supplement. In 1990, the English supplement became an independent weekly which by 2000 had a circulation of 26,183, while the Yiddish weekly had a circulation of 7,000 and falling.

As the influence of the Socialist Party in both American politics and in the Jewish community waned, the paper joined the American liberal mainstream though it maintained a social democratic orientation. The English version has some standing in the Jewish community as an outlet of liberal policy analysis. For a period in the 1990s, conservatives came to the fore of the English edition of the paper, but the break from tradition didn't last. (A number of conservatives dismissed from The Forward later helped to found the modern New York Sun.)

The Yiddish edition has recently enjoyed a modest increase in circulation as courses in the language have become more popular among university students; circulation has leveled out at about 5,500. Boris Sandler, one of the most significant contemporary secular writers in Yiddish, was the editor of the Yiddish Forward for 18 years, until March 2016; the new editor who succeeded him is Rukhl Schaechter.

From 2013 to 2017, prior to the current format as a monthly magazine, The Forward was published as a newspaper in separate English weekly and Yiddish biweekly editions, and online daily. Each was effectively an independent publication with its own contents. Jane Eisner became the first female editor in chief of the English Forward in June 2008. The previous editor in chief was J. J. Goldberg, who served from 2000 to 2007; since that time he has been editor at large. The paper maintains a left of center editorial stance.

In August 2015, The Forward received wide attention for reporting from Iran at a charged moment in American politics, as the U.S. Congress was ramping up to a vote on an accord reached the month before to limit Tehran's nuclear ability in return for lifting international oil and financial sanctions. Assistant Managing Editor Larry Cohler-Esses was, in the words of The New York Times, "The first journalist from an American Jewish pro-Israel publication to be given an Iranian visa since 1979."

For a few years, there was also a Russian edition. The website of The Forward describes its formation: "In the fall of 1995 a Russian-language edition of the Forward was launched, under the editorship of Vladimir "Velvl" Yedidowich. The decision to launch a Russian Forward in the crowded market of Russian-language journalism in New York followed approaches to the Forward Association by a number of intellectual leaders in the fast-growing émigré community who expressed an interest in adding a voice that was strongly Jewish, yet with a secular, social-democratic orientation and an appreciation for the cultural dimension of Jewish life."

The Russian edition was sold to RAJI (Russian American Jews for Israel) in 2004, although initially it kept the name. In contrast to its English counterpart, the Russian edition and its readership were more sympathetic to right-wing voices. In March 2007, it was renamed the Forum.

Around the same time in 2004, the Forward Association also sold off its interest in WEVD to The Walt Disney Company's sports division, ESPN.

The name of the publication was shortened to The Forward in April 2015.

As of July 2016, The Forward began publishing a monthly magazine.  The last newspaper published was the June 30, 2016, issue.

Notable columns and features
For 24 years, The Forward was the home of the column "Philologos". It now runs in Mosaic.

Alana Newhouse, who authored what The New York Times called "a coffee-table book" (A Living Lens: Photographs of Jewish Life From the Pages of The Forward), was the paper's arts and culture editor.

The New York Times described the paper's "A Bintel Brief" feature as "homespun advice ... which predated Dear Abby."

Jewish Daily Forward Building

At the peak of its circulation, The Forward erected a ten-story office building at 175 East Broadway on the Lower East Side, designed by architect George Boehm and completed in 1912. It was a prime location, across the street from Seward Park. The building was embellished with marble columns and panels and stained glass windows. The facade features carved bas relief portraits of Karl Marx, Friedrich Engels (who co-authored, with Marx, The Communist Manifesto), and Ferdinand Lassalle, founder of the first mass German labor party. A fourth relief portrays a person whose identity has not been clearly established, and has been identified as Wilhelm Liebknecht, Karl Liebknecht, or August Bebel. The paper moved out in 1974, and in the real-estate boom of the 1990s the building was converted to condominiums. The Forward, which in 2007 was headquartered at East 33rd Street, is in the Financial District .

Forward 50
The "Forward 50" is a list of 50 Jewish Americans "who have made a significant impact on the Jewish story in the past year", published annually as an editorial opinion of The Forward since 1994. The list was the initiative of Seth Lipsky, founding editor of the English Forward.

According to the magazine's website, this is not a scientific study, but rather the opinion of staff members, assisted by nominations from readers. The Forward does not endorse or support any of the people in the listing. The rankings are divided into different categories (which may vary from year to year): Top Picks, Politics, Activism, Religion, Community, Culture, Philanthropy, Scandals, Sports and, as of 2010, Food.

The list also includes those Jews whose impact in the past year has been dramatic and damaging.

The Forward in English
The Forward began publishing in English in the 1980s, and a 2019 review observed that both Yiddish and English were being produced for its online edition.

Funding for the English edition became available when The Forward sold its FM radio station.

While the idea was said to have germinated in 1983, when the Yiddish-only paper "announced that it was going to retreat to weekly publication," and the actualization of an English edition as an ongoing paper in 1990, by 2010 Seth Lipsky was described as "formerly editor of the English-language edition."

See also
 Algemeiner Journal

References

Further reading

External links

 
 (Yiddish)
The transition from the Russian Forward to Forum
Online, searchable The Forward editions from the Historical Jewish Press

1897 establishments in New York City
Publications established in 1897
Jewish newspapers published in the United States
Jewish-American history
Yiddish-language newspapers published in the United States
Jews and Judaism in New York City
Yiddish socialist newspapers
Newspapers published in New York City
Weekly newspapers published in the United States
Non-English-language newspapers published in New York (state)
Socialist newspapers published in the United States
Online newspapers with defunct print editions